Year 947 (CMXLVII) was a common year starting on Friday (link will display the full calendar) of the Julian calendar.

Events 
 By place 

 Europe 
 Summer – A Hungarian army led by Grand Prince Taksony campaigns in Italy, heading southwards on the eastern shore of the peninsula. It besieges Larino and reaches Otranto, plundering Apulia for three months. Berengar of Ivrea negotiates a truce and offers them a massive tribute (for which he imposes a special tax).
 Winter – King Otto I cedes the Duchy of Bavaria to his brother Henry I. To secure his rule, Henry is married to Judith, a daughter of Arnulf I ("the Bad"), and appoints a series of counts palatine.

 England 
 Horsham, a market town on the upper reaches of the Aran River in West Sussex, is first mentioned in 'King Eadred's land charter' (see History of Horsham).

 Arabian Empire 
 August 19 – Abu Yazid, a Kharijite Berber leader who has led a rebellion against the Fatimid Caliphate in Ifriqiya, is defeated in the Hodna Mountains (modern-day Algeria). Caliph al-Mansur bi-Nasr Allah sets about restoring the Fatimid dominion over North Africa.

 China 
 January 11 – Emperor Tai Zong of the Khitan-led Liao Dynasty invades the Later Jin (Five Dynasties), resulting in the destruction of the Later Jin. Khitan forces head southwards to the Yellow River, but must return to their base in present-day Beijing in May after Tai Zong dies of an illness. 
 March 10 – The Later Han is founded by Liu Zhiyuan, the military governor (jiedushi) of Bingzhou. He declares himself emperor (formally called Gaozu) and establishes the capital in Bian, present-day Kaifeng.

 By topic 

 Literature 
 Al-Masudi, an Arab historian and geographer, completes his large-scale work The Meadows of Gold and Mines of Gems, a historical book about the beginning of the world, starting with Adam and Eve.

Births 
 Al-Qadir, Abbasid caliph of Baghdad (d. 1031)
 Fujiwara no Koshi, Japanese empress (d. 979)
 Raja Raja Chola I, king of Chola Kingdom (d. 1014)

Deaths 
 January 12 – Sang Weihan, Chinese chief of staff (b. 898)
 January 27 – Zhang Yanze, Chinese general and governor
 January 28 – Jing Yanguang, Chinese general (b. 892)
 May 18 – Tai Zong, emperor of the Liao Dynasty (b. 902)
 May 30 – Ma Xifan, king of Chu (Ten Kingdoms) (b. 899)
 June 21 – Zhang Li, official of the Liao Dynasty
 June 22 – Qian Hongzuo, king of Wuyue (b. 928)
 June 23
 Li Congyi, prince of Later Tang (b. 931)
 Wang, imperial consort of Later Tang
 August 19 – Abu Yazid, Kharijite Berber leader (b. 873)
 November 23 – Berthold, duke of Bavaria
 Ce Acatl Topiltzin, Toltec ruler (approximate date)
 Hugh of Arles, king of Italy and Lower Burgundy
 Jordi, bishop of Vic (Spain) (approximate date)
 Li Renda, Chinese warlord and governor
 Liu Xu, chancellor of Later Tang and Later Jin (b. 888)
 Wulfgar, bishop of Lichfield (approximate date)

References